Jungbaaz is a Hindi action drama  movie directed by Mehul Kumar. It stars Raaj Kumar, Govinda, Mandakini in lead roles. The movie was remake of tamil film Jallikattu.

Plot

Cast
Raaj Kumar as Advocate KP Saxena
Govinda as Arjun Shrivastav
Mandakini as Sangeeta Mathur / Neena Ninjo
Prem Chopra as Bahadur Singh
Shakti Kapoor as Numbaridas
Danny Denzongpa as Mahakaal
Raj Kiran as Inspector Jwala Prasad Saxena
Moushumi Chatterjee as Mrs. Krishna Prasad Saxena
Gulshan Grover as Rocky Verma
Tej Sapru as Teju
Aruna Irani as Neelam
Vikas Anand as Judge

Soundtrack
Lyrics: Ravindra Jain

External links

1989 films
1980s Hindi-language films
Films directed by Mehul Kumar
Films scored by Ravindra Jain